Nguyễn Hoàng Hải (born April 30, 1982) is a Vietnamese Pop/R&B singer. He won the contest Sao Mai Điểm Hẹn in 2006 and since then has risen to his current fame.

Biography 

Hoàng Hải was a member of the band Tình Bạn, which also includes his friend and current manager Nguyễn Minh Sơn and also Lương Ngọc Châu, the one who has composed songs exclusively for Hải's vocal range.

References

1982 births
Living people
People from Hanoi
21st-century Vietnamese male singers